The Ashgabat trolleybus system formed part of the public transport network in Ashgabat, the capital city of Turkmenistan. It was the only trolleybus system ever in that country.

History
Opened on 19 October 1964, the system was operated during the Soviet era by various Soviet-built trolleybuses, which by 2011 had all been withdrawn.  The system closed at the end of 2011, with the last day of service being 31 December 2011.

Lines 
In 2011, its final year of operation, the system was made up of the following seven lines: 1, 2, 2A, 3, 5, 7 and 8.

Fleet 
In 2011, the Ashgabat trolleybus fleet was made up exclusively of Škoda 14TrM trolleybuses, introduced to the fleet in 2000 and financed by the World Bank.

See also

List of trolleybus systems
Trolleybuses in former Soviet Union countries

References

External links
 
 

Transport in Ashgabat
Ashgabat
Ashgabat